Golden Path, is a 1945 Soviet drama film directed by Konstantine Pipinashvili.

Plot 
Bandits kidnap caravans with gold and take them to China. The partisan detachment is to find a mine, which was hidden in the mountains.

Starring 
 Vladimir Chobur as Father and son Perekrestov (as V. Chobur)
 Pyotr Sobolevsky as Friet Ebing (as P. Sobolevski)
 Andrey Fayt as Fijngorst (as A. Fayt)
 Kote Daushvili as Shetman
 L. Romanov as Mironov
 Viktor Kulakov as Nikodimov
 Boris Andreyev as Epifanstev (as B. Andreev)
 Dimitri Mjavia as Professor (as D. Mjavya)
 Nikolay Gorlov as Gujinski
 Fyodor Ishchenko as Fisherman (as F. Ishchenko)
 Leonid Alekseev as Mitrich (as L. Alekseev)
 Sasha Chobur as Vasia
 Grigol Chechelashvili as Major (as G. Chechelashvili)
 Valodia Tsuladze
 Niko Gvaradze as Irot
 Leila Abashidze as Juta

References

External links 
 

1945 films
1940s Russian-language films
Soviet drama films
1945 drama films
Soviet black-and-white films